Üsküdar is an underground station and the western terminus of the M5 line of the Istanbul Metro in Üsküdar. It is located beneath Üsküdar Square, near the Bosporus in the Mimar Sinan neighborhood. Connection to trans-Bosporus Marmaray commuter rail service is available from Üsküdar station as well as IETT city buses and municipal ferries from Üsküdar pier.

The station consists of an island platform with two tracks. Since the M5 is an ATO line, protective gates on each side of the platform open only when a train is in the station. Üsküdar station was opened on 15 December 2017, together with eight other stations to Yamanevler.

Station layout

References

Railway stations opened in 2017
Istanbul metro stations
Üsküdar
2017 establishments in Turkey